The List of Ottoman post offices in Palestine contains those post offices operated in Palestine during Ottoman rule. The establishment of a new imperial postal system in 1834 and development of the transportation network resulted in vast improvements in the transport and communications systems. International and domestic post offices were operated by the Ottoman administration in almost every large city in Palestine, including Acre, Haifa, Safed, Tiberias, Nablus, Jerusalem, Jaffa, and Gaza.

The Imperial edict of 12 Ramasan 1256 (14 October 1840) led to substantial improvements in the Ottoman postal system and a web of prescribed and regular despatch rider (tatar) routes was instituted. Beginning in 1841, the Beirut-route was extended to serve Palestine, going from Beirut via Damascus and Acre to Jerusalem.

Postal services were organized at the local level by the provincial governors and these leases (posta mültesimi) came up for auction annually in the month of March. It is reported that in 1846 Italian businessmen Santelli and Micciarelli became leaseholders and ran a service from Jerusalem to Ramle, Jaffa, Sûr, and Saida.
By 1852, a weekly service operated from Saida via Sûr, Acre (connection to Beirut), Haifa, and Jaffa to Jerusalem, also serving Nablus beginning in 1856. That same year, two new routes came into operation: Jerusalem–Hebron–Gaza, and Tiberias–Nazareth–Chefa Omer–Acre. In 1867, the Jerusalem-Jaffa route operated twice a week, and beginning in 1884, the Nablus-Jaffa route received daily despatches.

Initially all the postal facilities had the status of relay stations, and letters received their postmarks only at the Beirut post office. In contradiction to that rule, a small number of markings Djebel Lubnan have been discovered: these are believed by philatelists to have been applied by a relay station at Staura (Lebanon). In the 1860s, most relay stations were promoted to the status of branch post offices and received postmarks, initially only negative seals, of their own. The postmarks of an office's postal section usually contained the words posta shubesi, as opposed to telegraf hanei for the telegraph section. In 1860 ten postal facilities worked in Palestine, rising to 20 in 1900 and 32 in 1917.

Ottoman post offices

A number of post offices are only known from archival material such as proof strikes of postmarks in Turkish PTT archives or lists prepared by the Ottoman Post for the UPU before 1914. Philatelists have so far not recorded any genuinely used postmarks or other postal material for these postal facilities:

Travelling post offices
Travelling post offices existed on three routes:
 The Jaffa–Jerusalem route was officially opened on September 26, 1892 with stops at Jaffa, Ludd, Ramle, Sedshed, Deir Aban, Bittir, and Jerusalem. In 1888, the developer Joseph Navon had received a 71-year license, which he later sold to French investors, who operated the company as Société du Chemin de Fer Ottoman de Jaffa à Jerusalem et Prolonguements. The company was nationalized at the start of the war in 1914. Navon's license expressly prohibited the company from transporting mail for the various foreign post offices. Postmarks for this travelling post office, some inscribed Bur. Amb. Jerusalem–Jaffa, are registered by collectors from May 13, 1893 to December 14, 1914.
 The Damascus–Haifa  route was completed in 1906 as a branch of the Hejaz Railway with stops at Dera'a, Muzerib, Zeizun, Tel el-Makarim, El-Hadshara, Wadi Kleit, El-Hammi, Semach, Dshisr el-Majami, Beit Shean, Shatta, Afule, Tel esh-Shamam, Esh-Shamaria, and Haifa. Postmarks for this travelling post office, inscribed Damas–Caiffa, are registered by collectors from 1908 to June 2, 1921 (one postmark remained in use during E.E.F. control).
 The Messudshi–Nablus route was completed in 1914. Use of the postmark inscribed Nablous–Caiffa/Ambulant is only known for September 25, 1914.<ref
name=Birken_Beyrut293037>Birken, 2007, Vol. Beyrut, pp. 29-30, 37.</ref>

No TPO postmarks are known for other railway lines operating during this period, irrespective of whether these lines actually did transport mail. Lines operating were (year of completion): Acre–Beled esh-Shech (1912), Afule–Djennine (1913), Djennine–Messudshi (1914), Messudshi–Tulkarem–Ludd (1915), Wadi Sarrar–Et-Tine–Beersheba, Beersheba–Hafir (1915), Et-Tine–Gaza (1916), and Deir el-Balah–Beersheba (1916).

See also
Ottoman postal rates in Palestine
Postage stamps and postal history of Palestine

References and sources
Header Notes

Notes

Sources
 Abuljebain, Nader K. (2001). Palestinian history in postage stamps = تاريخ فلسطين في طوابع البري. Beirut: Institute for Palestine Studies/Welfare Association.
 Birken, Andreas (2007). Die Poststempel = The postmarks. Volumes Beirut and Suriye. Hamburg: Arbeitsgemeinschaft Osmanisches Reich/Türkei, ©2003, 2007. (CD-ROM, updated irregularly)
 Coles, John H. and Howard E. Walker (1987). Postal cancellations of the Ottoman Empire. Part 2: the lost territories in Africa and Asia. London & Bournemouth: Christie's Robson Lowe. .
 Collins, Norman J. and Anton Steichele (2000). The Ottoman post and telegraph offices in Palestine and Sinai. London: Sahara. .
 Levy, Thomas E. (1995). The Archaeology of Society in the Holy Land. Continuum. .
 Lindenberg, Paul P. (1926). Das Postwesen Palästinas vor der britischen Besetzung. Vienna: Die Postmarke.

Palestine (region)-related lists
Postal system of Turkey
Philately of Turkey
Ottoman Empire-related lists